Helena Nancy Moreno (born September 30, 1977) is a Mexican-American realtor, equestrienne, former journalist, and politician serving as the president of the New Orleans City Council and First Division Councilmember-at-Large.

Moreno was formerly a Democratic member of the Louisiana House of Representatives, where she represented the District 93. She was first elected in May 2010 during a special election and was unopposed in her re-election in the fall of 2011.

On October 14, 2017, Moreno was elected to the Division 1 at-large seat on the New Orleans City Council, winning by nearly 2–1 against her two opponents, fellow Democratic state Representative Joseph Bouie Jr. and Democrat Kenneth Cutno, and avoiding a runoff.

Early life and education
Helena Moreno was born in the seaside city of Veracruz, Mexico, the daughter of oil executive Felix Moreno and academic Nancy Pearson Moreno. With her parents she moved to Houston, Texas, where she was a 1995 graduate of Episcopal High School. Moreno is a 1999 graduate in mass communication from Southern Methodist University (SMU) in Dallas, Texas, where she wrote for the Daily Campus; she also studied at American University in the District of Columbia while working in the White House for First Lady Hillary Clinton. A native speaker of both English and Spanish, Moreno studied for six months in Madrid, Spain.

Career

Journalism
Prior to graduation from SMU, Moreno completed internships with KTRK-TV and KHOU-TV in Houston. After graduation, she went to WTOC-TV in Savannah, Georgia, whence she was recruited by Hearst-Argyle Broadcasting Corporation for WDSU-TV in New Orleans. At WDSU, Moreno became anchor for the morning news. Her reporting during Hurricane Katrina brought her accolades, including a citation as Broadcaster of the Year from the Louisiana Federation of Teachers, an affiliate of the (AFL-CIO). During her career in journalism, she received several awards from the Associated Press, was voted best television reporter by Gambit Magazine readers for four consecutive years and was part of the team awarded an Emmy for outstanding coverage during hurricane Katrina. She left her broadcast news career in 2008 to pursue public service.

Politics
In March 2008, Moreno resigned from WDSU to challenge then-incumbent United States Representative William J. Jefferson in Louisiana's 2nd congressional district Democratic primary election. Her campaign was insistent on obtaining "the answers we deserve" concerning inadequate efforts to rebuild New Orleans after Hurricane Katrina. She received sufficient votes to force the incumbent into a runoff election, which Jefferson won.

Jefferson was subsequently defeated, in the general election, by Republican Joseph Cao, who had Moreno's endorsement as well as that of other Democrats such as City Councilwomen Jacquelyn Brechtel Clarkson and Stacy Head.

In 2010, after the election of Karen Carter Peterson to the Louisiana State Senate, Moreno became a candidate for Peterson's vacated District 93 seat in the Louisiana House of Representatives. The special election primary occurred on 2010 May 1, with Moreno obtaining 27 percent of the vote and entering a runoff election with James Perry, who had 38 percent. Much of the runoff campaign, which Moreno won, involved personal issues of allegations of traffic violations. The allegations, and Perry's handling of them, were such that two weeks before the runoff the Times-Picayune, which earlier had endorsed Perry, withdrew its endorsement.

Personal life 
Moreno is also a realtor with Talbot Realty Group in New Orleans and resides in Uptown, New Orleans with her husband, Chris Meeks.

Involvement in fatal car crash 
On October 14, 2002, a Jeep Grand Cherokee driven by Moreno struck another car that had run a red light at Martin Luther King Jr. Boulevard and Carondelet Street, according to a police report. A passenger in the other car died. According to the report, Moreno admitted to driving 35 in a 25 mph zone, and the investigator determined that the other car ran the red light.

The incident became the subject of controversy in 2010 when a political opponent attacked Moreno for her involvement in the accident, attempting to link Moreno to the death of the passenger in the other car with a campaign news release referring to an "accident report involving alleged negligent homicide and apparent preferential treatment."

The police report notes that Moreno was taken to the Ochsner Foundation Hospital by police officers before investigators arrived. At the hospital, she answered authorities' questions and submitted to blood and urine tests. The report states that Moreno "did not display any signs of impairment ... or the odor of alcoholic beverages on her breath," and concludes that if the driver of the other vehicle had "not disregarded the traffic signal, the crash may not have occurred."

See also
 Rosalind Peychaud

References

1977 births
20th-century American journalists
20th-century American women
21st-century American journalists
21st-century American politicians
21st-century American women politicians
American United Methodists
American University alumni
American women journalists
Communications consultants
Hispanic and Latino American women in politics
Journalists from Texas
Living people
Democratic Party members of the Louisiana House of Representatives
Mexican emigrants to the United States
New Orleans City Council members
People from Houston
People from Veracruz (city)
Politicians from Savannah, Georgia
Politicians from Veracruz
Southern Methodist University alumni
Women city councillors in Louisiana
Women state legislators in Louisiana
Writers from Veracruz